Magnus Smith (1869–1934) was a three-time Canadian chess champion in 1899, 1904 and 1906.

The Magnus Smith Trap in the Sicilian Defence is named after him.

References

Canadian chess players
1869 births
1934 deaths